The Heart Principle is a 2021 romance novel written by Helen Hoang.

References

2021 novels
American romance novels
English-language novels